"California" is a song by Canadian pop rock band Wave. It was released in April 2001 as the lead single from their debut album, Nothing As It Seems. The song was the 18th most played song on Canadian radio in 2001, and the third-most played song on Canadian radio in 2001 by a Canadian artist. The song was also nominated for "Best Single" at the 2002 Juno Awards.

Year-end charts

Eric Ethridge version

In 2018, Canadian country singer Eric Ethridge also recorded a cover version of the song. His version was included on his debut self-titled extended play.

Commercial performance
Ethridge’s version peaked at number 35 on the Billboard Canada Country chart and was certified Gold by Music Canada.

Music video
The official music video for Ethridge's version of "California" premiered on September 6, 2018.

Charts

Certifications

References

2001 debut singles
2001 songs
Wave (band) songs
Eric Ethridge songs
Warner Music Group singles
Songs about California
Songs written by Dave Thomson (musician)